Eduard Toman (born 25 May 1960 in Kharkiv) is an Estonian actor.

In 1983 he graduated from the theatre school in Moscow. 1983-1993 and 2005–2011, he was an actor at Russian Theatre; 1993-2005 being its artistical manager.

Besides theatrical roles she has also played on several films and television series.

Awards
 2002: Order of the White Star, V class.

Filmography

 1992: Need vanad armastuskirjad
 1994: Tulivesi
 1993-1995: Salmonid
 2006-2007: Kelgukoerad
 2008: Tuulepealne maa

References

Living people
1960 births
Estonian male stage actors
Estonian male film actors
Estonian male television actors
Estonian theatre directors
Recipients of the Order of the White Star, 5th Class